Meryan may refer to:

 Merya people, a historic ethnic group of Russia
 Merya language, an extinct Uralic language
 Meryan Rodnovery, a religious movement of Russia
 Maryan, Iran (disambiguation), or Meryan, several places in Iran

See also 
 Merya (disambiguation)
 Merian (disambiguation)
 Maryan (disambiguation)